The following is a list of extinct dog breeds, varieties, landraces and types.

List of extinct dog breeds, varieties, landraces and types

References

Citations

Bibliography
 
 
 
 
 
 
 
 
 
 
 
 
 
 
 

 
Dog,Extinct
Dog breeds